The Unha Line is an electrified railway line of the Korean State Railway in Manp'o city, Chagang Province, North Korea, running from Manp'o on the Manp'o Line to Unha.

History
The Unha Line was opened by the Chosen Government Railway on 1 February 1939, together with the final section of the Manp'o Line running from Kanggye to Manp'o.

Route 

A yellow background in the "Distance" box indicates that section of the line is not electrified.

References

Railway lines in North Korea
Standard gauge railways in North Korea